Bailey Junior Kurariki (born May 15, 1989) was convicted of the manslaughter of pizza delivery man Michael Choy in Papakura, Auckland, New Zealand on the 12th of September 2001.   He was 12 years and 252 days old the day Choy was killed, making him the youngest person convicted of killing in New Zealand history.

At the time of Choy's death Kurariki was in the custody of Child, Youth and Family rather than his mother Lorraine West but had absconded, he had been in trouble since the age of five and had not been to school for more than a year.

In the days following the death of Choy, Kurariki was interviewed by police and reportedly confessed to the killings. However, police did not follow the correct procedures in conducting an interview with an alleged offender under 17, making the results of the interview inadmissible.

Choy's stepfather Ken Croskery became active in the Sensible Sentencing Trust, a lobby group campaigning for longer sentences. After his death, 10 years later, his family claim he died of a broken heart.

Kurariki reportedly was "born-again" while in prison, and was released on parole on May 5, 2008 but has been in trouble with the courts since and has connections to the Killer Beez gang. There has also been contention about the nature of evidence needed to recall him to jail for breaching parole

In 2011 Kurariki was convicted for assault and domestic violence charges and sentenced to 14 months in prison, during one hearing he declared himself to be "just an innocent black man".

References 

1989 births
Living people
New Zealand people convicted of manslaughter
New Zealand Māori people
Prisoners and detainees of New Zealand